Fourteenth Army or 14th Army may refer to:

 14th Army (German Empire), a World War I field Army
 14th Army (Wehrmacht), a World War II field army
 Italian Fourteenth Army
 Japanese Fourteenth Army, a World War II field army, in 1944 converted to Japanese Fourteenth Area Army
 14th Army (Soviet Union)
 Soviet 14th Guards Army, which occupied Moldovan Transnistria during the Transnistria War
 Fourteenth Army (United Kingdom)
 Fourteenth United States Army, a World War II 'phantom' force